Horrabad or Horabad may refer to:
Horrabad-e Olya, Lorestan Province
Horrabad-e Sofla, Lorestan Province
Horrabad, Markazi
Horrabad, Mazandaran